The 2017 Piala Presiden is the 33rd season of the Piala Presiden, the youth level (Under-21) football league of Malaysia. The competition organized by the Football Association of Malaysia (FAM).

Rule changes
The Piala Presiden is the amateur football competition in Malaysia for under-21 players. Since its inception in 1985, Piala Presiden has been the major tournament for under-21 and under-23 players. In 2009, the format of the competition was changed with only under-20 players eligible to be fielded for the tournament. In 2015 the format of the competition reverted to the original format with under-21 players.

Teams

The following teams will be participate in the 2017 Piala Presiden. In order by the number given by FAM.

Team summaries

Personnel and kits
Note: Flags indicate national team as has been defined under FIFA eligibility rules. Players and Managers may hold more than one non-FIFA nationality.

League table

Group A

Group B

Result table

Group A

Group B

Knock-out stage

Bracket

Quarterfinals
The first legs were played on 21 September, and the second legs were played on 26 September 2017.
|-

First Leg

Second Leg

Kedah won 4–1 on aggregate.

First Leg

Second Leg

Selangor won 2–0 on aggregate.

First Leg

Second Leg

2–2 on aggregate. Kelantan won on away goals.

First Leg

Second Leg

Terengganu won 3–2 on aggregate.

Semifinals
The first legs were played on 1 and 2 October, and the second legs were played on 6 October 2017.
|-

First Leg

Second Leg

1–1 on aggregate. Selangor won on away goals.

First Leg

Second Leg

3–3 on aggregate. Terengganu won on away goals.

Final

First Leg

Second Leg

Selangor won 2–1 on aggregate.

Champions

Season statistics

Top scorers

See also

 2017 Malaysia Super League
 2017 Malaysia Premier League
 2017 Malaysia FAM League
 2017 Malaysia FA Cup
 2017 Malaysia Youth League

References

External links
 Football Association of Malaysia
 SPMB 

2017 in Malaysian football
Piala Presiden (Malaysia)